Krimson Creek is the second solo studio album by American rapper Boondox. It was released on May 13, 2008 via Psychopathic Records. It features guest appearances from Blaze Ya Dead Homie, Insane Clown Posse and Twiztid, and music by Brian Kuma, Mike E. Clark, Martin "Tino" Gross, Darkeonz, Dr. Punch, Eric Davie, Scott Sumner, and UnderRated. The album peaked at number 113 on the Billboard 200, number 13 on the Independent Albums, number 12 on the Top Rap Albums and topped the Heatseekers Albums charts in the US.

The liner notes included with the album contained excerpts from all fifteen tracks on the album, also included was a foldout poster featuring a larger, complete depiction of the cover art.

Music and lyrics
Krimson Creek is a more personal work than The Harvest, with songs inspired by events from Boondox' life, including an incident in which his uncle tried to kill him by drowning him in a swimming pool, getting into fights at his school and experiments with drugs. The final track, "Death of a Hater", was inspired by negative reactions to his music. "I've read things where I've had people say, 'I hate him. I hope he dies. I hope his kids die' [...] I pretty much wrote a song about what I would do to those people".

Track listing

Personnel
David "Boondox" Hutto – lyrics & vocals (tracks: 2-15), music (track 1), additional guitar
Joseph "Violent J" Bruce – lyrics & vocals (track 7), music (track 10), engineering (tracks: 2-15)
Joseph "Shaggy 2 Dope" Utsler – lyrics & vocals (track 7)
Paul "Monoxide Child" Methric – lyrics & vocals (track 14)
Chris "Blaze Ya Dead Homie" Rouleau – lyrics & vocals (track 14)
James "Jamie Madrox" Spaniolo – lyrics & vocals (track 15)
Juan Ramon "Razor Ray" Reyes – additional vocals & additional guitar
Amanda Porter – additional vocals
Brittney Squires – additional vocals
Jake Polzia – additional vocals
Brian Kuma – music (tracks: 1, 3, 6, 9, 14, 15)
Michael Earl Clark – music (tracks: 2, 4, 8, 13)
Martin "Tino" Gross – music (tracks: 2, 13)
Darkeonz – music (track 5)
Eric Davie – music (track 7), engineering (tracks: 2-15)
Scott Sumner – music (track 11)
Josh "UnderRated" Liederman – music (track 12)

Charts

References

External links

2008 albums
Boondox albums
Psychopathic Records albums
Albums produced by Joseph Bruce
Albums produced by Mike E. Clark